Frederick Cramer House is a historic home located in Colonie in Albany County, New York.  It was built in 1877 and is a -story brick farmhouse in the Gothic Revival style. It is a "T" shaped residence with a five-bay-wide main section.  It features an enclosed 1-story portico at the center entrance.  Also on the property are a contributing barn and shed.

It was listed on the National Register of Historic Places in 1985.

References

Houses on the National Register of Historic Places in New York (state)
Gothic Revival architecture in New York (state)
Houses completed in 1877
Houses in Albany County, New York
National Register of Historic Places in Albany County, New York
1877 establishments in New York (state)